Karangasso is a village and seat (chef-lieu) of the commune of Nafanga in the Cercle of Koutiala in the Sikasso Region of southern Mali.

References

Populated places in Sikasso Region